Buchema shearmani is a species of sea snail, a marine gastropod mollusk in the family Horaiclavidae.

Description
The length of the shell attains 10 mm.

Distribution
This marine species occurs off Somalia

References

 Morassi M. & Bonfitto A. (2013) Four new African turriform gastropods (Mollusca: Conoidea). Zootaxa 3710(3): 271–280.

Endemic fauna of Somalia
shearmani
Gastropods described in 2013